Universiti Brunei Darussalam (UBD;) is a national research university located in Bandar Seri Begawan, Brunei. It was established in 1985 and has since become the largest university in the country in terms of student enrollment and curriculum offered.

UBD is ranked 86th in Asia by the 2020 QS Asia University Rankings
, and 254th in the world by the 2021 QS World University Rankings.

Background

History
UBD was established in 1985, opening its doors to the first intake of 176 students. Since then, UBD has seen an increase in the number of graduates, the introduction of new academic programmes, the enhancement of infrastructure and the development of graduate studies.

The university moved to its current location, Tungku Link, in 1995. There are nine academic faculties and seven research institutes covering the fields of Science, Health Sciences, Asian Studies, Policy Studies, Education, Business, Engineering, Biodiversity, Advanced Materials & Energy Sciences, Advanced Research, Applied Data Analytics, Islamic Studies, Leadership, Innovation & Advancement.

International students
UBD opened its doors to international students from its inception. Over the years, there has been an increase in diversity, with many students coming from East Asia (China and Japan), Europe, Africa and the Middle East. Today, UBD offers a range of programmes to enhance international relations, such as the Brunei-US Enrichment Programme for ASEAN and the Discovery Year programme, which encourages students to go abroad during the third year of their undergraduate programme.

Academics
Admissions to UBD are extremely competitive. Brunei had only four large universities that offer undergraduate and graduate studies; two of them are religious universities. Local applicants could only apply through the online service known as HECAS (Higher Education Centralised Admission System) where representatives of Ministry of Education and local universities pick only qualified students that meet the requirements of points of specific exams such as General Cambridge Education A-Level Examinations.

Faculties and institutes

 Academy of Brunei Studies (APB)
 Faculty of Arts and Social Sciences (FASS)
 UBD School of Business and Economics (UBDSBE)
 Faculty of Science (FOS)
 Faculty of Integrated Technologies (FIT)
 Sultan Hassanal Bolkiah Institute of Education (SHBIE)
 PAPRSB Institute of Health Sciences (PAPRSB IHS)
 Institute of Asian Studies (IAS)
 Institute for Leadership, Innovation and Advancement (ILIA)
 Institute of Policy Studies (IPS)
 SOAS Centre for Islamic Studies (SOASCIS)
 e-Government Innovation Centre
 UBD|IBM Centre
 Institute for Biodiversity and Environmental Research (IBER)
 Centre for Advanced Material and Energy Sciences (CAMES)
 Centre for Advance Research (CARe)
 Language Centre (LC)
 Centre for Lifelong Learning (C3L)

Undergraduate
UBD currently offers five undergraduate degree programmes:
 Bachelor of Business and Economic
 Bachelor of Science
 Bachelor of Health Science
 Bachelor of Arts and Social Science
 Bachelor of Engineering

Graduate Study
UBD offers graduate degrees (Masters by coursework or by research and PhD) in the following disciplines:
 Islamic Civilisation and Contemporary Issues
 Islamic Banking and Finance
 Education
 Energy Studies
 Computing and New Media
 Crop Science
 Primary Health Care
 Brunei Studies
 Malay Language and Linguistics
 Art, Professional Communication and Media
 Asian Studies

MRCGP (International)
The MRCGP (International) examinations were first established in the Institute of Medicine in 2005 after Brunei Darussalam was awarded host body status by the Royal College of General Practitioners (RCGP), UK. Membership of the RCGP has long been established and recognized as the standard assessment for family doctors. Brunei Darussalam is the first host examining body in the region and has successfully conducted the exams since 2005.

University Mosque
Construction on the University Mosque (Masjid Universiti) began in 1992 on a site of two hectares of land, and was completed in 1994, with a total cost of BND $7,600,000. The mosque was officially opened in 1995 by His Majesty Sultan Haji Hassanal Bolkiah. It has a capacity of 1800. The mosque is mainly used for religious activities carried out by the university and it also serves daily prayers for the Muslims students and the surrounding locals.

International rankings

In 2020 UBD has climbed to 254 in the world rankings, another achievement for the university.

Vice-chancellors

Partner institutions

Southeast Asia

Singapore
National University of Singapore
Nanyang Technological University

Malaysia
Universiti Malaya
Universiti Teknologi Malaysia
Universiti Malaysia Sabah
Universiti Sains Malaysia
Universiti Utara Malaysia
Universiti Putra Malaysia
University College of Technology Sarawak
Universiti Tunku Abdul Rahman
Universiti Malaysia Kelantan

Indonesia
Universitas Indonesia
Bina Nusantara University
Universitas Pekalongan
Universitas Airlangga
Institut Teknologi Bandung
Universitas Gajah Mada
Institut Teknologi Sepuluh Nopember

The Philippines
University of the Philippines
De La Salle University
Ateneo de Manila University

Vietnam
FPT University

Notable alumni
Professor Dr. Hj. Awang Asbol bin Hj. Mail, Professor in History and International Studies and Academy of Brunei Studies
Professor Ampuan Dr. Haji Brahim Bin Ampuan Haji Tengah, Professor in Academy of Brunei Studies
Princess Majeedah Nuurul Bolkiah
Princess Rashidah Sa'adatul Bolkiah
Princess Masna Bolkiah
Crown Princess Sarah
Prince Abdul Malik
Adee Suhardee Muhidin, Brunei national football team player and Brunei Super League's football club manager.
Khairunnisa Ash'ari, Ex-Brunei Legislative Council
Ahmaddin Abdul Rahman, Minister of Home Affairs

References

External links

ASEAN University Network
Educational institutions established in 1985
1985 establishments in Brunei
Universiti Brunei Darussalam